The four temperament theory is a proto-psychological theory which suggests that there are four fundamental personality types: sanguine, choleric, melancholic, and phlegmatic. Most formulations include the possibility of mixtures among the types where an individual's personality types overlap and they share two or more temperaments. Greek physician Hippocrates (c. 460 – c. 370 BC) described the four temperaments as part of the ancient medical concept of humourism, that four bodily fluids affect human personality traits and behaviours. Modern medical science does not define a fixed relationship between internal secretions and personality, although some psychological personality type systems use categories similar to the Greek temperaments.

History 
Temperament theory has its roots in the ancient theory of humourism. It may have originated in  Mesopotamia, but it was Greek physician Hippocrates (460–370 BC) (and later Galen) who developed it into a medical theory. He believed that certain human moods, emotions, and behaviours were caused by an excess or lack of body fluids (called "humours"), which he classified as blood, yellow bile, black bile, and phlegm. Each of which was responsible for different patterns in personalities, as well as how susceptible you were to getting a disease. Galen (AD 129 – c. 200) developed the first typology of temperament in his dissertation De temperamentis, and searched for physiological reasons for different behaviours in humans. He classified them as hot/cold and dry/wet taken from the four elements. There could also be balance between the qualities, yielding a total of nine temperaments. The word "temperament" itself comes from Latin "temperare", "to mix". In the ideal personality, the complementary characteristics were exquisitely balanced among warm-cool and dry-moist. In four less-ideal types, one of the four qualities was dominant over all the others. In the remaining four types, one pair of qualities dominated the complementary pair; for example, warm and moist dominated cool and dry. These last four were the temperamental categories which Galen named "sanguine", "choleric", "melancholic", and "phlegmatic" after the bodily humours. Each was the result of an excess of one of the humours which produced the imbalance in paired qualities.

The properties of these humours also corresponded to the four seasons. Thus blood, which was considered hot and wet, corresponded to spring. Yellow bile, considered hot and dry, corresponded to summer. Black bile, cold and dry, corresponded to autumn. And finally, phlegm, cold and wet, corresponded to winter.

These properties were considered the basis of health and disease. This meant that having a balance and good mixture of the humours defined good health, while an imbalance or separation of the humours led to disease. Because the humours corresponded to certain seasons, one way to avoid an imbalance or disease was to change health-related habits depending on the season. Some physicians did this by regulating a patient's diet, while some used remedies such as phlebotomy and purges to get rid of excess blood. Even Galen proposed a theory of the importance of proper digestion in forming healthy blood. The idea was that the two most important factors when digesting are the types of food and the person's body temperature. This meant that if too much heat were involved, then the blood would become "overcooked." This meant that it would contain too much of the yellow bile, and the patient would become feverish. If there were not enough heat involved, this would cause there to be too much phlegm. 

Persian polymath Avicenna (980–1037 AD) extended the theory of temperaments in his Canon of Medicine, which was a standard medical text at many medieval universities. He applied them to "emotional aspects, mental capacity, moral attitudes, self-awareness, movements and dreams." Nicholas Culpeper (1616–1654) suggested that the humors acted as governing principles in bodily health, with astrological correspondences, and explained their influence upon physiognomy and personality. He proposed that some people had a single temperament, while others had an admixture of two, a primary and secondary temperament.

Modern medical science has rejected the theories of the four temperaments, though their use persists as a metaphor within certain psychological fields. Immanuel Kant (1724–1804), Erich Adickes (1866–1925), Alfred Adler (1879–1937), Eduard Spranger (1914), Ernst Kretschmer (1920), and Erich Fromm (1947) all theorised on the four temperaments (with different names) and greatly shaped modern theories of temperament. Hans Eysenck (1916–1997) was one of the first psychologists to analyse personality differences using a psycho-statistical method called factor analysis, and his research led him to believe that temperament is biologically based. The factors that he proposed in his book Dimensions of Personality were neuroticism (N), the tendency to experience negative emotions, and extraversion (E), the tendency to enjoy positive events, especially social ones. By pairing the two dimensions, Eysenck noted how the results were similar to the four ancient temperaments.

In the field of physiology. Studies of physiologist Ivan Pavlov on the types and properties of the nervous system, where three main properties were identified: (1) strength, (2) mobility of nervous processes and (3) balance between excitation and inhibition and derived four types based on these three properties.

Other researchers developed similar systems, many of which did not use the ancient temperament names, and several paired extraversion with a different factor which would determine relationship and task-orientation. Examples are DISC assessment and social styles. One of the most popular today is the Keirsey Temperament Sorter, whose four temperaments were based largely on the Greek gods Apollo, Dionysus, Epimetheus, and Prometheus, and were mapped to the 16 types of the Myers–Briggs Type Indicator (MBTI). They were renamed as Artisan (SP), Guardian (SJ), Idealist (NF), and Rational (NT).

Modern views, implementations and restatements 
Waldorf education and anthroposophy believe that the temperaments help to understand personality. They also  believe that is useful for education, helping the teachers understand how the child learns. Christian writer Tim LaHaye has attempted to repopularize the ancient temperaments through his books.

Usage 
The 18th-century classical composer Carl Philipp Emanuel Bach composed a trio sonata in C minor known as Sanguineus et Melancholicus (Wq 161/1). In the 20th century, Carl Nielsen's Symphony No. 2 (Op.16) is subtitled  "The Four Temperaments", each of the four movements being inspired by a sketch of a particular temperament. Paul Hindemith's Theme and Four Variations for string orchestra and piano is also known as The Four Temperaments: although originally conceived as a ballet for Léonide Massine, the score was ultimately completed as a commission for George Balanchine, who subsequently choreographed it as a neoclassical ballet, using the theory of the temperaments as a point of departure.

The 19th-century French author Émile Zola used the four temperaments as a basis for his novel Thérèse Raquin.

See also 

 
 
 
 
 
 
 Table of similar systems of comparison of temperaments

References

Further reading 
Arikha, Noga (2007). Passions and Tempers: A History of the Humours.  Harpers.  
 Edelman, Kathleen (2019). I Said This, You Heard That: How Your Wiring Colors Your Communication. North Point Resources.

External links 
 In Our Time (BBC Radio 4) episode on the four humours in MP3 format, 45 minutes
 I Said This, You Heard That (A Group Study in the Four Temperaments) interactive workbook format that includes a temperament assessment; accompanying teaching videos available through the free app. 
 Shakespeare and the Four Humors

Personality typologies